Brunhilda may refer to:

 Brunhild, a figure in Germanic heroic legend
 Brunhilda of Austrasia (c. 543–613), Frankish queen
 Brunhilda (bird), a genus of birds

See also 
 
 

 Broom-Hilda, an American newspaper comic strip
 Broomhilda Von Shaft, a character in the 2012 film Django Unchained